Kadavoor Sivadasan (also known as K. Sivadasan) (11 March 1932 – 17 May 2019) was a Minister in the Indian state of Kerala, Political leader, a noted advocate, and trade unionist from Kerala, India.

Political career
Entering politics through students movements, he became the president of Progressive Students Union (PSU) in 1958. Later he enrolled as an advocate in Kollam Bar and was in active practice.

Sivadasan got elected to the Kerala Legislative Assembly for first time in 1980 contesting as an RSP candidate. He became elected in 1982 too as an RSP member.  In 1991, 1996 and 2001 he got elected again, contesting as a candidate of the Indian National Congress.

Sivadasan was the minister for labour from 28 December 1981 to 17 March 1982 and minister for labour and excise during 1982–87 in the ministries headed by K. Karunakaran.

He served as Minister for Forests and Wildlife from 20 April 1995 to 9 May 1996 in the Ministry headed by A. K. Antony; again he was the Minister for Electricity from 26 May 2001 to 11 February 2004 and held the portfolios of health and family welfare from 11 February 2004 to 29 August 2004 in the ministry, also headed by A. K. Antony. Sivadasan was a senior congress leader and also served as DCC president of Kollam district, Kerala.  

An active trade unionist, Sivadasan served as Secretary of Kerala Provisional United Trade Union Congress in 1977, and participated in the International Labour Organization (ILO) conference in Geneva representing Central Government in 1985. He also visited Italy, Switzerland, France, Germany and United Arab Emirates in various capacities.

Assembly election candidature history

Death
He died on 17 May 2019 due to age-related illness.

References

External links
Niyamasabha

Trade unionists from Kerala
Indian National Congress politicians from Kerala
2019 deaths
1932 births
People from Ernakulam district
Members of the Kerala Legislative Assembly
20th-century Indian politicians